The 2015 VTV Cup Championship will be the 12th staging of the international tournament. The tournament will be held at the Bạc Liêu Gymnasium in Bạc Liêu, Vietnam.

Pool composition
6 teams are set to participate at the tournament.
 (hosts)
 Nanjing University
 Liaoning Volleyball Club
 April 25 Sports Club

Preliminary round

|}

|}

|}

|}

|}

|}
Fixtures: Thể Thao Việt Nam

Final round

Bracket

Semifinals

|}

5th place

|}

3rd place

|}

Final

|}

Final standing

|}

Awards

Most Valuable Player
 Jong Jin Sim
Best Outside Spikers
 Chatchu-on Moksri
 Ajcharaporn Kongyot
Best Setter
 Lao Meiqi

Best Opposite Spiker
 Ju Un Hyang
Best Middle Blockers
 Thatdao Nuekjang
 Nguyễn Thị Ngọc Hoa
Best Libero
 Gong Meizi
Miss VTV Cup 2015
 Nguyễn Linh Chi

References

VTV International Women's Volleyball Cup
VTV Cup
VTV Cup